Wahida Mollick Jolly is a Bangladeshi actress. She works on stage plays, television dramas and films. She won Bangladesh National Film Award for Best Costume Design for the film Mrittika Maya (2013).

Background
Jolly's parents settled in Rajshahi from West Bengal. Her father, Tofazzal Hossain, was a stage performer and director. Her elder sister Sharmili Ahmed was an actress. Jolly performed regularly as a child artist in radio dramas. She started stage performances in tenth grade. She earned a degree in social work and then moved to Kolkata to study drama in Rabindra Bharati University. She debuted in a Hindi television series.

Career
Jolly debuted her stage acting career in 1975 by her role in Spartacus Bishoyok Jotilota, written by Momtazuddin Ahmed. Her debut television drama, E Ki Jalaton, also by Momtazuddin Ahmed, was in 1986.

Jolly acted in films including Adhiar (1999) and Shorgo Theke Norok.

Jolly established a theatre group Drishwakabbo in 1990. She is a faculty member of the Department of Theatre and Performance Studies at University of Dhaka. Her husband Rahmat Ali is also an Associate Professor of the Department at Theatre and Performance Studies of Dhaka University.

Works

Television 
 Ronger Manush (2004-2005)
 Vober Hat
 Doll's House
 Sakin Sarisuri
 Jhamela Unlimited
 Ujan Ganger Naiya
 Labonyoprobha

Filmography 
 Lalon (2004)
 Molla Barir Bou (2005)
 Daruchini Dip (2007)
 Mon Diyechi Tomake (2009)
 Dubshatar (2010)
 Amar Bondhu Rashed (2011)
 Mrittika Maya (2013)
 Jibondhuli (2014)
 Swargo Theke Norok (2015)
 Ekti Cinemar Golpo (2018)

Awards
 32nd Bachsas Awards for Best Supporting Actress in Ronger Manush
 38th Bangladesh National Film Awards for Best Costume Designer in Mrittika Maya

References

External links
 

Living people
Academic staff of the University of Dhaka
Bangladeshi stage actresses
Bangladeshi film actresses
Bangladeshi television actresses
Best Costume Design National Film Award (Bangladesh) winners
Bangladeshi costume designers
Year of birth missing (living people)
Place of birth missing (living people)
20th-century Bangladeshi actresses
21st-century Bangladeshi actresses
Rabindra Bharati University alumni